Psychotria longipetiolata is a species of plant in the family Rubiaceae. It is endemic to Sri Lanka.

References

longipetiolata
Flora of Sri Lanka
Endangered plants
Taxonomy articles created by Polbot